A list of films produced by the Marathi language film industry based in Maharashtra in the year 1950.

1950 Releases
A list of Marathi films released in 1950.

References

External links
Gomolo - 

Lists of 1950 films by country or language
1950
1950 in Indian cinema